New Public Administration is an anti-positivist, anti-technical, and anti-hierarchical reaction against traditional public administration. A practiced theory in response to the ever changing needs of the public and how institutions and administrations go about solving them. Its focus is on the role of government and how it can provide these services to citizens who are a part of the public interest, by means of, but not limited to, public policy.

History  
New Public Administration traces its origins to the first Minnowbrook Conference held in 1968 under the patronage of Dwight Waldo. This conference brought together the top scholars in public administration and management to discuss and reflect on the state of the field and its future.  The 1960s in the USA was a time of unusual social and political turbulence and upheaval.  In this context, Waldo concluded that neither the study nor the practice of public administration was responding suitably to the escalating turmoil and the complications that arose from those conditions. Part of the reasoning for this Waldo argued, was the general mistrust that had become associated with public administration itself.  A call to revamp the ethical obligations of the service sector was necessary in rebuilding the public's trust of government and bureaucracy in which had been plagued by corruption and the narrow self interests of others.  Moving toward a more ethical public service, then, required attention to the underlying values that support public service-and public servants-in any sector.

The New Public Management (NPM) did not offer public servants an alternative model to help them resolve emerging conflicts and tensions. Concepts of citizenship, democracy or public interest have evolved over time and they are continuing to evolve. Consequently, the role of government and the role of the public service are being transformed in ways that push beyond the constraints of the Classic model he lenses of varying perspectives can challenge, clarify, and create a history that boasts enough depth to serve as not only a history in a traditional sense but also an interactive timeline that ignites constant improvement. At its core, public service requires a vision that extends beyond narrow self-interest. Waldo sees public administration and bureaucracy as integrally bound to civilization and to our culture in two senses: the evolution of civilization itself was dependent upon public administration and related concepts are constitutive elements within out specific civilization and culture.

New Public Administration theory deals with the following issues:
 Democratic citizenship; Refers directly to the belief in creating a government where the "common man" has a voice in politics. For such an approach to work, citizens must become aware, knowledgeable, and active in their communities and nations. True democratic citizenship requires more than voting for representatives. It requires using one's own mind, voice, and actions.
 Public interest; Refers to the collective common good within society, to which is the main objective of public     interest. 
 Public policy; The means by which new public policy is enacted, and introduced. Not limited in participation of the public but encouraged involvement.  
Services to citizens; Providing and upholding the moral and ethical standard in regards to meeting the needs of citizens  through institutions and bureaucracies.

First, a ‘new’ theory should start with the ideal of democratic citizenship. The public service derives its true meaning from its mandate to serve citizens to advance the public good. This is the raison d’être of the institution, the source of motivation and pride of all those who choose to make it their life, whether for a season or for an entire career.

Main Features of new public administration 
These are:

1. Citizen's Empowerment:

One of the key components of New Public Management is citizen empowerment.  NPM ensures the citizen's freedom of choice. It ensures quality services to citizens. Healthy competition in the service and product sectors allows citizens to choose their services and products according to their needs and choices.

2. Services for Managerial support:

The primary goal of managerial support services is to guarantee the level of service provided to citizens. The best talent available on the market is therefore attracted by attractive pay, incentives, and other benefits. NPM consistently recommends skill-improving programs to achieve the best results.

3. Structural Changes in Administratio: the new public administration approach calls for small, flexible and less hierarchical structures In administration so that the citizens administration interface could become more flexible and comfortable. The organizational structure should be in with the socially relevant conditions.

4.Multi-disciplinary Nature of Public Administration: knowledge from several disciplines and not just one dominating paradigm build the discipline of public administration. The political, social, economic, management and human relation approaches are needed to ensure the growth of discipline.

5. Politics-Administration Dichotomy]]: since administrators today are involved in policy formulation and policy implementation at all the stages. Dichotomy meaning "a division or contrast between two things that are or are represented as being opposed or entirely different".

6. Awareness: Bring attention to the works of a public administration and the task that public administrators carry out for the community and for the government. Jobs of public administrators affect communities and large numbers of people. The importance of the job should be highlighted.

7. Case Studies: Case studies help public administrators highlight situations and events where policies were not carried out as they should be. They set an example for what to do and what not to do. Case studies are a basic way to break down events in order to learn from other people's mistakes and the affects those mistakes have had on the community. With public administration being a job devoted to the people; it is an obvious way to see the reality of the work you do in the community. While there are many cases where policies were not carried out as planned. There are also plenty of examples of executed policies that have benefited communities, and those are important to look at as well.

8. Structure Change: Public Administration is moving  in many different directions, it is more often called Public Management now. This is because the job is moving towards a direction of not only implementing policy to people but also managing policies as it trickles down through the law process, so that it is realistic for communities and the people in them.

9. Jack of All Trades: the best public administrators tend to be someone who has knowledge in politics and law, but also has a hand in community functions. This allows for a smooth transition from policy to implementation.

10. Change: With the changes in the world, the job of public administration has changed. The job may be the same, but titles like Public Manager and Public Adviser have replaced the title Public Administrator.

Themes 
Relevance: Traditional public administration has too little interest in contemporary problems and issues. Social realities must be taken into consideration. i.e. people should see changes as relevant meaning thereby that changes should be specific to the needs of the area and the need of the people. Earlier approaches to NPA considered that rationality of the people was neglected. NPA suggests the inclusion of rationality of the people too in the process of policy formulation and validation.
Values: Value-neutrality in public administration is an impossibility. The values being served through administrative action must be transparent. To practice transparency in public administration is to ensure citizens the availability of information which is deemed public. This should be an organizational goal, and is to be taken into account when conducting all public business regardless of one's job title. If the goal of an organization is to serve the citizens to the best of their ability, then avoiding or failing to achieve transparency would cause significant damage to the relationship between them and the people they are aiming to serve.
Social Equity: Realization of social equity should be a chief goal of public administration.
Change: Skepticism toward the deeply rooted powers invested in permanent institutions and the status quo. Operational flexibility and organisational adaptability to meet the environmental changes should be in-built in the administrative system.
Client Focus: Positive, proactive, and responsive administrators rather than inaccessible and authoritarian "ivory tower" bureaucrats.
Management-Worker relations. There should be equal emphasis both on efficiency and humane considerations. The new approach has to satisfy both the efficiency and the human relations criterion in order to achieve success.

NPA provides solutions for achieving these goals, popularly called 4 D's i.e. Decentralisation, Debureaucratisation, Delegation and Democratisation.

Criticism 
Though New Public Administration brought public administration closer to political science, it was criticized as anti-theoretic and anti-management. Robert T. Golembiewski describes it as radicalism in words and status quo in skills and technologies. Further, it must be counted as only a cruel reminder of the gap in the field between aspiration and performance. Golembiewski considers it as a temporary and transitional phenomena. In other words, we can say that the solutions for achieving the goals and anti-goals were not provided by the NPA scholars explicitly. Secondly, how much one should decentralize or delegate or debureaucratize or democratize in order to achieve the goals? On this front NPA is totally silent.

As said in A New Synthesis of Public Administration, governments have always been called upon to make difficult decisions, undertake complicated initiatives and face complex problems characteristical of the period. This is not in dispute. Nonetheless, the current circumstances is to determine what can be handled in the traditional way and what must be done differently.

Governments have always been called upon to face difficult problems. Setting priorities and making choices have always been difficult. For example, eliminating a sizable deficit is “merely” a difficult problem, although it is hard to believe when one is in the middle of such a heart-wrenching exercise. This entails making choices among equally deserving public purposes and making tough decisions about what should be preserved for the future. It requires reconciling future needs with what could garner a sufficient degree of public support in the short term to move forward. Academic public administration has lagged considerably behind practicing public administration. Improved curricula and a refocusing of emphasis upon the policy dynamics of government administration will be important factors in enticing more students to study of public administration. It is more important to increase the number and improving the geographic spread of universities with public affairs programs, integrating public affairs components into the curricula of other graduate and professional programs, developing many more in-service, mid-career educational programs for public servants, and utilizing existing resources to strengthen public affairs programs.

The motives behind the promotion of New Public Administration is also in question in the case of Hong Kong. As Anthony Cheung argues, officials often employed the rhetoric of New Public Administration to roll back public expenditure and decrease welfare provision in the 1990s. Governors at that time used the excuse of administrative efficiency to curtail the power of the bureaucracy.

Significance 
Felix and Lloyd Nigro observe that New Public Administration has seriously jolted the traditional concepts and outlook of the discipline and enriched the subject by imparting a wider perspective by linking it closely to the society.
The overall focus in NPA movement seems to be to make administration to be less "generic" and more "public", less "descriptive" and more "prescriptive", less "institution-oriented" and more "client-oriented", less "neutral" and more "normative" but should be no less scientific all the same.

References 

Public administration